General elections were held in the Faroe Islands on 23 January 1928. The Self-Government Party emerged as the largest in the Løgting, winning 11 of the 23 seats.

Results

References

Elections in the Faroe Islands
Faroe Islands
1928 in the Faroe Islands
January 1928 events
Election and referendum articles with incomplete results